Eric Joshua Seall (born September 10, 1998), known professionally as Ace Aura, is an American DJ, record producer and remixer from McKinney, Texas. He is known as a pioneer of the future riddim subgenre, which is characterized by the minimalistic rhythmic elements of riddim, with a heavy emphasis on chords, melodies and experimental sounds. He has released five EPs, along with numerous singles and official remixes for record labels including Monstercat, Circus Records, Dim Mak Records, Buygore, Ophelia Records, Disciple and Never Say Die Records. He has performed at music festivals and venues across North America and Australia, including Electric Zoo, Banc of California Stadium, Legend Valley, Red Rocks Amphitheater, Bill Graham Civic Auditorium, the Great Saltair, the Hollywood Palladium, the Mission Ballroom and the Ogden Theatre.

Background 
Eric Seall was born on September 10, 1998, in Plano, Texas. He was raised in a Protestant household in McKinney and attended church regularly. He started playing drums at the age of 8 and played with his church's youth group band, which was his first experience performing music publicly.

He was introduced to electronic music in eighth grade when his friend showed him the Dirtyphonics remix of “Scary Monsters and Nice Sprites” by Skrillex during lunch. This event prompted him to learn how to make dubstep, using a demo version of Pro Tools he had received for Christmas.

He is a devout Christian and has said that his faith is a central part of the way he writes music. His EP Reset_Environment is inspired by the Book of Revelation.

In 2020, he graduated from the University of Texas at Dallas with a Bachelor of Computer Science.

Career 

Seall posted his first song, “Rise of the Angels,” to his Bandcamp page on November 18, 2012, with a PWYW digital download option. He continued to release music in that same fashion until March 9, 2016, when he self-released his single “Metamorphosis” on all streaming platforms.

In July 2017, he joined a remix competition for the song “Wait for Me” by British DJ and producer Chime, in which his entry won second place. On April 19, 2018, Seall released his debut EP Exodus on Ninety9Lives. Chime signed Seall's song “Ensnared” and EP Guided Wandering to his record label Rushdown, and collaborated with him on a remix of “Wet Napkin” by Ray Volpe in 2018. In November of the same year, Seall accused Kentucky producer Joshua Gleason of allegedly stealing the remix and releasing it as his own song under the moniker thesourwarhead, which Gleason later denied in a statement on his Facebook page.

He released his third EP Comatose on February 21, 2020. In April 2020, he collaborated with Millennial Trash on the song “Noddin’,” which was placed in several editorial playlists on Spotify. On August 12, 2020, his song "Another Heart," which he produced with Skybreak and Sharks in under 24 hours, was released on artbyFORM's All Nighter Vol. 5 compilation, with all proceeds from streams and digital sales being donated to Doctors Without Borders. On August 28, 2020, he released his fourth EP Reset_Environment through Disciple Round Table, as well as a remix of the Riot Ten and Whales song “Save You” through Steve Aoki’s Dim Mak Records. On November 27, 2020, he released his song “Waiting” on Borgore’s Buygore imprint.

He released his Monstercat debut single “Stay” with Tynan on January 11, 2021. On March 4, 2021, he released Comatose: Awakening, an album containing six remixes of songs from the Comatose EP and a new original song titled “Adrenaline.”  On April 9, 2021, he released another remix album titled The Noddin’ Remixes No One Asked For, which featured 12 remixes of “Noddin’,” along with a sequel to the song, dubbed “Noddin’ 2.” In May 2021, he collaborated with Chime on a Splice sample pack titled Melodic Riddim Vol. 1, which debuted at #1 on the site's "weekly top packs" chart and remained there for four consecutive weeks. On May 7, 2021, he released the song “Resist” with Subtronics. The following month, he supported Subtronics at Red Rocks Amphitheatre and performed “Resist” on stage with him. He self-released his song “Cyber Cuddle” on June 4, 2021. On June 24, 2021, he released his collaboration with Crankdat, titled “The Feeling,” on Monstercat. On August 20, 2021, he released his fifth EP Gem World through Never Say Die. The EP's title track was played in DJ sets by Skrillex, Slander, Nghtmre, DJ Diesel, Flosstradamus and Valentino Khan. On September 20, 2021, he put out his first solo Monstercat release, “Destiny.” On September 27, 2021, he performed at Excision’s Lost Lands festival. On December 10th, 2021, he released the single "Falling for You" with Slippy on Insomniac's Bassrush imprint, as well as his remix of "Just Like You" by Kompany.

On February 24, 2022, he released his fourth Monstercat single "Umbra," featuring vocals from German electronic artist Voicians. According to Seall, the song was originally a remix of "Blue Shadows" by Xilent, but it was adapted into an original so it could be released officially. He collaborated with Virus Syndicate on the song "Level" from their Resistance EP, which released on April 15, 2022. On May 13, 2022, he returned to Rushdown to release a VIP remix of "Tongues of Fire." On June 24, 2022, he debuted on Seven Lions' Ophelia imprint alongside Nytrix with the single "Echoes," a followup to their 2021 collaboration "Shattered." In July 2022, he traveled to Australia for his first international tour, performing in Sydney, Mackay, Perth and Brisbane. On July 7, 2022, he released an official remix of Boombox Cartel and Moody Good's song "Shadow" featuring Calivania. On July 17, 2022, he announced his sixth EP Revive through a substitution cipher within a cryptic video he posted to social media. The EP released on July 22, 2022, via Ophelia and included the single "Echoes," as well as three new songs. On July 29, 2022, he released a remix of the song "It Was You" by Said the Sky and We the Kings on the former's Sentiment (The Remixes) album, which also included remixes by Autograf, Elohim, We Are Fury, Blanke and Nurko.

On January 26, 2023, he returned to Circus Records to release his seventh EP Crystal Coalition. The EP was his first EP to be composed entirely of collaborations and included songs with Beastboi, Mikesh!ft, Skybreak, SpaceYeti and Phocust.

Discography

Extended plays

Remix albums

Singles

As a featured artist

Remixes

References 

American DJs
1998 births
Record producers from Texas
Dubstep musicians
Living people
Monstercat artists
Electronic dance music DJs